Bacillariaceae is a family of diatoms in the phylum Heterokontophyta, the only family in the order Bacillariales. Some species of genera such as Nitzchia are found in halophilic environments;  for example, in the seasonally flooded Makgadikgadi Pans in Botswana.

Genera
This family includes these genera:

Allonitzschia  (1)
Bacillaria Gmelin (155)	 
Crucidenticula  (8)
Cylindrotheca Rabenh.	 
Cymbellonitzschia Hustedt in A.Schmidt et al. (7)	 
Denticula Kütz. (178)	 
Denticulopsis R. Simonsen and T. Kanaya, 1961 (20)	 
Fragilariopsis Hustedt in A. Schmidt (41)	 
Gomphonitzschia  (14)
Grunowia  (19)
Hantzschia Grunow, 1877 (258) 
Neodenticula Akiba and Yanagisawa, 1986 (2)	 
Nitzschia Hassall, 1845	(2k)
Nitzschiella  (18)
Ophidocampa  (15)
Perrya  (7)
Psammodictyona  (5)
Pseudo-nitzschia H. Perag. and Perag., 1900 (81)
Simonsenia  (3)
Tryblionella W.Sm., 1853 (103)

Figures in brackets are approx. how many species per family.

See also
 Extremophile

References

Bacillariales
Diatom families
Taxa named by Christian Gottfried Ehrenberg